Hybanthus (green-violet) is a genus of flowering plants in the family Violaceae. This genus name is Greek for "humpback flower", referring to the drooping pedicels of plants that are part of this genus. The genus is grossly polyphyletic and may contain up to nine different genera, of which Pombalia Vand., Cubelium Raf. and Pigea DC. have been previously recognised.

Species

Hybanthus contains the following species:

Hybanthus attenuatus
Hybanthus aurantiacus (Benth.) F.Muell.
Hybanthus calycinus (DC.) F.Muell.
Hybanthus concolor
Hybanthus cymulosus C.A.Gardner
Hybanthus debilissimus F.Muell.
Hybanthus enneaspermus (L.) F.Muell.
Hybanthus epacroides (L.) Melch.
Hybanthus floribundus (Lindl.) F.Muell.
Hybanthus linearifolius
Hybanthus monopetalus (Schult.) Domin
Hybanthus stellarioides (Domin) P.I.Forst.
Hybanthus vernonii (F.Muell.) F.Muell. 
Hybanthus verticillatus
Hybanthus volubilis E.M.Benn.

References

Bibliography

External links

 
Malpighiales genera